Jiří Böhm (born 16 December 1987) is a former professional Czech football player who most recently played for FK Chmel Blšany.

References

External links
 Guardian Football
 Profile at Vysočina Jihlava website
 Profile at Slavia Prague website

Czech footballers
1987 births
Czech First League players
Living people
FK Dukla Prague players
FC Vysočina Jihlava players
FK Viktoria Žižkov players
SK Slavia Prague players
FK Bohemians Prague (Střížkov) players
FC Nitra players
FK Kolín players
Slovak Super Liga players
Expatriate footballers in Slovakia
Czech expatriate sportspeople in Slovakia

Association football forwards